Alexa Glatch (born September 10, 1989) is an American professional tennis player.

Junior career
She started playing tennis at the age of five. As a junior player, she won the prestigious Easter Bowl title in the Girls-14s and Girls-18s divisions and the Orange Bowl in the Girls-16s division in 2004. She achieved a world junior ranking of No. 5 in 2005, advancing to the 2005 US Open finals in both singles and doubles. She lost the singles final to junior, and future senior world No. 1, Victoria Azarenka. She represented the United States in numerous international competitions including Junior Fed Cup.

Professional career
Glatch turned professional in 2005 and in that year reached the semifinals of the Forest Hills Tennis Classic and the second round of the US Open. She was in an accident in November 2005; her injuries included a broken right wrist and left elbow. It took her eight months until she could start regularly playing competitive tennis again.

In 2007, she won the Southlake $25k USTA Pro Circuit event for her second career pro title and reached the quarterfinals of the Washington, D.C. $75k USTA Pro Circuit event. She was a finalist at the French Open junior doubles with partner Sorana Cîrstea of Romania. She also reached the quarterfinals of three $50k events. In 2008, Glatch reached the quarterfinals of the Dothan $75k USTA Pro Circuit event, was a finalist at the Carson $50k event, and was the singles champion at both the Toronto and Saguenay $50k events. She was one of three American women to make the 2008 US Open as a qualifier. She also had two semifinal finishes in doubles and won the doubles title at the $50k San Diego Pro Circuit tournament.

Glatch reached the third round of the 2009 BNP Paribas Open as a wildcard; one of her wins was against world No. 29, Carla Suárez Navarro. At the 2009 Sony Ericsson Open, Alexa advanced to the second round before losing to No. 1 seed, Serena Williams, 2–6, 3–6. She made her Fed Cup debut in April in the semifinals against the Czech Republic. As a rookie, she was dubbed the MVP for keeping the US alive by pulling off upset wins in both of her singles matches against No. 29, Iveta Benešová, and future world No. 2, Petra Kvitová, in straight sets.

In May 2009, Glatch made her French Open debut by defeating 14th-seeded clay-court specialist Flavia Pennetta in the first round.

Glatch lost in the first round of the 2009 US Open to defending champion Serena Williams. In women's doubles, Glatch played with fellow American Carly Gullickson and advanced to the round of 16.

In March 2012, she began working with Australian coach Sarah Stone, who is the former coach of 2011 US Open champion Samantha Stosur.

At the 2012 French Open, she won three matches and beat two seeds to qualify for the main draw. She defeated Anna Tatishvili to advance to the second round where she lost to 18th-seeded Flavia Pennetta.

In July 2012, she reached the second round of Mercury Insurance Open 2012, Carlsbad losing to former world No. 3, Nadia Petrova, 4–6  3–6.

In October 2012, Glatch won two back-to-back grass-court tournaments in Japan.

Following an appearance at Wimbledon in 2013, Glatch took 15 months off to deal with injuries. She had wrist and hip surgeries and went through extensive rehabilitation. Upon her return to competitive tennis in October 2014, she won the doubles event at the $50k Macon Pro Circuit event.

In 2015, Glatch used her protected singles ranking to enter the 2015 Australian Open Qualifying, where she defeated No. 3 seed and world No. 110, Lourdes Dominguez-Lino, and advanced to the final round of qualifying. In March/April, Glatch continued her post-injury, rapid rise up the rankings by winning the $25k Iripuato Mexico and the $50k Osprey Florida Pro Circuit event (as a wildcard) defeating top seeded world No. 44, Madison Brengle, in the final. She continued her good form by qualifying for the 2015 French Open main draw, and subsequently added a tenth ITF title by winning the Gatineau, Canada $25K without dropping a set.

Grand Slam singles performance timeline

Personal life
Alexa graduated from Laurel Springs High School. She was accepted to UCLA but opted not to attend.
Some of her favorite tennis players include Steffi Graf and Roger Federer. After many years with Nike and time with ASICS, she now endorses Roche sportswear, Babolat rackets, and SOS Rehydrate sports drinks.

ITF Circuit finals

Singles: 17 (11 titles, 6 runner–ups)

Doubles: 12 (8 titles, 4 runner–ups)

Notes

References

External links

 
 
 
 
 Interview with Alexa Glatch

American female tennis players
Sportspeople from Newport Beach, California
Tennis people from California
1989 births
Living people
People from Delray Beach, Florida
21st-century American women